Treat 'Em Right is a 1990 extended play (EP) by hip hop artist Chubb Rock. The EP contains the title track, "Treat 'Em Right".

Track listing
 "Treat 'Em Right" (4:44)  
 "Keep It Street" (2:38)
 "Regiments of Steel" (4:39)
 "What's the Word" (4:00)  
 "The Organizer" (3:20)  
 "Treat 'Em Right" [Cribb Mix] (4:41)

Chart performance

References

External links
 Treat 'Em Right at Discogs

1990 debut EPs
Chubb Rock albums
Select Records albums